This is a list of the main career statistics of Chinese tennis player Zheng Jie. She has won 19 WTA titles (four in singles and 15 in doubles). All of her singles titles are from WTA International tier, but played one WTA Premier final at the 2010 Warsaw Open. Given that she was more successful as a doubles player, she also won two Grand Slam titles, the Australian Open and Wimbledon Championships, both in 2006. Along with that, she finished twice as a semifinalist in singles, at the 2008 Wimbledon Championships and in 2010 at the Australian Open.

Playing for China at the Olympic Games, in 2008 in Beijing, she get the bronze in doubles alongside Yan Zi. In doubles, she also triumphed at the three WTA Premier Mandatory & 5 tournaments; at the 2006 Berlin Open, at the 2007 Charleston Open and at the 2011 Italian Open. In mixed doubles, she reached four semifinals. On the WTA Rankings, she finished at the No. 15 in singles in May 2009, while in doubles she was No. 3 in July 2006.

Performance timelines 

Only main-draw results in WTA Tour, Grand Slam tournaments, Fed Cup and Olympic Games are included in win–loss records.

Singles

Doubles

Mixed doubles

Significant finals

Grand Slam tournaments finals

Doubles: 3 (2 titles, 1 runner-up)

WTA Premier Mandatory & 5 finals

Doubles: 5 (3 titles, 2 runner-ups)

Other significant finals

Olympic finals

Doubles: 1 (bronze medal)

WTA career finals

Singles: 7 (4 titles, 3 runner-ups)

Doubles: 30 (15 titles, 15 runner-ups)

ITF Circuit finals

Singles: 10 (4 titles, 6 runner–ups)

Doubles: 23 (17 titles, 6 runner–ups)

Top 10 wins

Notes

References 

Zheng, Jie